Jonathan Schwartz or Jon Schwartz may refer to:

 Jon Schwartz (drummer), drummer with singer-songwriter "Weird Al" Yankovic
 Jonathan Schwartz (radio personality), radio disc jockey
 Jonathan I. Schwartz, former president and CEO of Sun Microsystems
 Jonathan Ira Schwartz (born 1982), American film producer, known as director of the 2005 film Frostbite
 Jonathan Schwartz (producer), American producer, known for the 2011 film Like Crazy
 Jonathan Schwartz (film producer), American producer, best known for his work at Marvel Studios

See also
John Schwartz (disambiguation)